MOSEK is a software package for the solution of linear, mixed-integer linear, quadratic, mixed-integer quadratic, quadratically constraint, conic and convex nonlinear mathematical optimization problems. The applicability of the solver varies widely and is commonly used for solving problems in areas such as engineering, finance and computer science.

The emphasis in MOSEK is on solving large scale sparse problems, in particular the interior-point optimizer for linear, conic quadratic (a.k.a. Second-order cone programming) and semi-definite (aka. semidefinite programming), which the software is considerably efficient solving.

A special feature of the solver, is its interior-point optimizer, based on the so-called homogeneous model. This implies that MOSEK can reliably detect a primal and/or dual infeasible status as documented in several published papers.

In addition to the interior-point optimizer MOSEK includes:
 Primal and dual simplex optimizer for linear problems.
 Mixed-integer optimizer for linear, quadratic and conic problems.

In version 9, Mosek introduced support for exponential and power cones in its solver. It has interfaces to the C, C#, Java, MATLAB, Python and R languages. Major modelling systems are made compatible with MOSEK, examples are: AMPL, and GAMS. In 2020 the solver also became available in Wolfram Mathematica.

In addition Mosek can for instance be used with the popular MATLAB packages CVX, and YALMIP.

The solver is developed by Mosek ApS, a Danish company established in 1997 by Erling D. Andersen. It has its office located in Copenhagen, the capital of Denmark.

References

Mathematical optimization software
Numerical software